Chronicles, 1967–1992 is a compilation album from the band Spirit. It followed on the heels of the previous year's compilation Time Circle, 1968–1972, which had focused on releasing material from the band's first four studio albums. Chronicles concentrates on unreleased material, such as outtakes, alternate and live versions, and some re-recordings.

Track listing 

 1–4, 22 are from Spirit's 1967 demo tape
 5–6 are live versions, 5, 8, 10-15 circa 1974
 7 circa 1975, 9 year unknown
 16-21 are 1991 recordings

References 

Spirit (band) albums
1991 greatest hits albums